Damascus Township is one of the thirteen townships of Henry County, Ohio, United States. As of the 2010 census the population was 1,801, of whom 1,076 lived in the unincorporated portion of the township.

Geography
Located in the eastern part of the county, it borders the following townships:
Washington Township - north
Providence Township, Lucas County - northeast corner
Grand Rapids Township, Wood County - east
Weston Township, Wood County - southeast, between Grand Rapids and Milton Townships
Milton Township, Wood County - southeast corner
Richfield Township - south
Monroe Township - southwest corner
Harrison Township - west
Liberty Township - northwest corner

The village of McClure is located in central Damascus Township.

Name and history
It is the only Damascus Township statewide.

Government
The township is governed by a three-member board of trustees, who are elected in November of odd-numbered years to a four-year term beginning on the following January 1. Two are elected in the year after the presidential election and one is elected in the year before it. There is also an elected township fiscal officer, who serves a four-year term beginning on April 1 of the year after the election, which is held in November of the year before the presidential election. Vacancies in the fiscal officership or on the board of trustees are filled by the remaining trustees.

References

External links
County website

Townships in Henry County, Ohio
Townships in Ohio